Wilhelm Hansen (4 March 1895 – 2 April 1974) was a Norwegian footballer. He played in two matches for the Norway national football team in 1913 to 1914.

References

External links
 

1895 births
1974 deaths
Norwegian footballers
Norway international footballers
Place of birth missing
Association footballers not categorized by position